Adyar is a suburb of Mangalore city in Karnataka, India.

Demographics
 India census, Adyar had a population of 6501. Males constitute 50% of the population and females 50%. Adyar has an average literacy rate of 73%, higher than the national average of 59.5%, with 78% of males and 68% of females literate. 13% of the population is under 6 years of age.

References

Villages in Dakshina Kannada district